Egmar Gonçalves (born 15 August 1970) is a Singaporean former professional soccer player. Born in Brazil, he took Singaporean nationality in 2002, under the Foreign Sports Talent Scheme, in order to play for the Singapore national football team.

Club career
In his time with Home United FC, Gonçalves scored a total of 239 S.League goals in 11 S.League seasons and was the first recipient of the 100 S.League goals award in 2001, although he had managed 107 by the end of that season. He reached the 100 goals mark in a hat-trick against SAFFC in a 4–0 win. It was due to S.League deciding not to include the inaugural Singapore Cup goals as it was known as League Cup but backtracked on it later. He was also awarded the 200 S.League goals award in 2004 which he reached the mark, in a hat-trick again, against Sinchi in a 5–1 win.

Gonçalves was the top scorer in the S.League in 2004 and joint top scorer with Indra Sahdan Daud in the AFC Cup in 2004.

In January 2007, Gonçalves returned to Brazil in  after failing to agree a new contract with Home United.

He was the all-time topscorer in the S.League until Mirko Grabovac later overtook his place.

He played for Desportiva Capixaba in Espírito Santo state and then retired.

International career
Gonçalves failed to make any impact for Singapore at international level. He was one of the players brought over in the unsuccessful foreign talent scheme endorsed by the Football Association of Singapore, although he is well remembered for scoring in the 4–2 away defeat against Iraq in the 2007 Asian Cup qualifying campaign.

Personal life
Gonçalves lives in Vila Velha city, Brazil, with his wife and children.

National team career statistics
Goals for Senior National Team

Honours

Club
Home United
S.League: 1999, 2003
Singapore Cup: 2000, 2001, 2003, 2005

Individual
100 S.League Goals: 2001
200 S.League Goals: 2004
S.League Top Scorer Award: 2004
AFC Cup Top Scorer Award: 2004

References

External links

People from Vila Velha
Singapore international footballers
Singaporean footballers
Brazilian footballers
Brazilian emigrants to Singapore
Brazilian expatriate footballers
Singapore Premier League players
1970 births
Living people
Association football forwards
Home United FC players
Sportspeople from Espírito Santo